Studena is a village in Southern Bulgaria. The village is located in Pernik Municipality, Pernik Province. Аccording to the numbers provided by the 2020 Bulgarian census, Studena currently has a population of 1740 people with a permanent address registration in the settlement.

Geography 
Studena village is located in Municipality Pernik, 15 kilometers away west from Pernik and 25 kilometers away from Sofia, the capital of Bulgaria. It is located near the southern hills of Vitosha mountain and borders Golo Bardo. There is a nearby water dam next to the village, bearing the same name Dam Studena.

The climate is continental, aside from the parts of the village which lie in a higher elevation than 800 meters, the climate above 800 meters is mountain climate.

The name of the village stems from a story, according to which a Bulgarian freedom fighter along with his troops held the Byzantine empire army for one hundred days at the location before they overtook Sofia. From that, sto dena, which means one hundred days transitioned roughly into Studena.

History 
The initial name of the village was Istudene and can be found in Ottoman text dating back to the 15th century. The village's festive day is “Arhangelovden” and has been honored each year after the local church had been built.

There is a church “Sveti Georgi” dating back to the 15th century that was renovated and can be visited in the village.

Ethnicity 
According to the Bulgarian population census in 2011.

References 

Villages in Pernik Province